Tracy Trotter is a cinematographer. Trotter has over thirty-five years of experience as a director of photography and has won three Emmy Awards for his cinematography. Trotter also teaches cinematography at Brooks Institute in Ventura, California.

References

Living people
Brooks Institute faculty
Year of birth missing (living people)